The standard competition in dancesport at the 2001 World Games took place on 25 August 2001 at the Akita City Gymnasium in Akita, Japan.

Competition format
A total of 24 pairs entered the competition. Best ten pairs from round one qualifies directly to the semifinal. In redance additional four pairs qualifies to the semifinal. From semifinal the best six pairs qualifies to the final.

Results

References

External links
 Results on IWGA website

Dancesport at the 2001 World Games